

Men's individual pursuit track cycling events at the 2004 Summer Paralympics were competed from 18 to 20 September at the Olympic Velodrome.

There were seven events. Each class began with races to set qualification times. In most classes the 8 fastest qualifiers then competed in 4 pursuit heats, with the two fastest winners proceeding to the gold medal race, and the two slower winners to the bronze medal match. In two classes with fewer than 8 entrants the 4 fastest qualifiers progressed directly to the two medal races.

B 1-3

Final Round
Gold

Bronze

CP 3

Final Round
Gold

Bronze

CP 4

Final Round
Gold

Bronze

LC 1

Final Round
Gold

Bronze

LC 2

Final Round
Gold

Bronze

LC 3

Final Round
Gold

Bronze

LC 4

Final Round
Gold

Bronze

References

Cycling at the 2004 Summer Paralympics